Hajji Babay-e Sofla (also Romanized as Ḩājjī Bābāy-e Soflá; also known as Ḩājjī Bābā-ye Soflá) is a village in Ansar Rural District, in the Central District of Takab County, West Azerbaijan Province, Iran. At the 2006 census, its population was 173, in 45 families.

References 

Populated places in Takab County